Mt. Olive Methodist Episcopal Church is a historic Methodist Episcopal church building in Leesburg, Virginia, United States.  It was built in 1890 and is a one-story, wood-frame building in the Late Gothic Revival style.  It sits on a fieldstone foundation and measures 23 feet wide and 42 feet deep.

It was listed on the National Register of Historic Places in 2005.

References

Carpenter Gothic church buildings in Virginia
Churches completed in 1890
Churches in Loudoun County, Virginia
Methodist churches in Virginia
National Register of Historic Places in Loudoun County, Virginia
Churches on the National Register of Historic Places in Virginia
Leesburg, Virginia